LGA 1248 is an Intel CPU Socket for Itanium processors from the 9300-series to the 9700-series. It replaces PAC611 (also known as PPGA661) used by Itanium 9100-series processors and adds Intel QuickPath Interconnect functionalities.

See also
 List of Intel microprocessors
 List of Intel Itanium microprocessors
 CPU socket

References

Intel CPU sockets